Bigfork or Big Fork may refer to the following places in the United States:

Big Fork, Arkansas
Bigfork, Minnesota
Bigfork Township, Itasca County, Minnesota
Bigfork, Montana
Big Fork River, Minnesota
Big Fork State Forest, Minnesota